Fissistigma is a genus of flowering plants in the family Annonaceae. There are about 75 species distributed in Africa, Asia and Oceania.

Species include:
 Fissistigma cupreonitens Merr. & Chun
 Fissistigma tungfangense Tsiang & P.T.Li
 Fissistigma verrucosum (Hook.f. & Thomson) Merr.

References

Annonaceae
Annonaceae genera
Taxonomy articles created by Polbot